P. Ubaidulla is a member of 15th Kerala Legislative Assembly. He is a member of Indian Union Muslim League and represents Malappuram constituency. He was reelected in 2021.

Positions held 
 Member, Kerala State Waqf Board (2019–Present ) 
 Member of 13th and 14th Kerala Legislative Assembly (2011–16, 2016–21)
 Member, District Council, Malappuram (1991–95)
 Member, District Panchayat (1995-2000 & 2000-2005) 
 General Secretary, Muslim Youth League Malappuram District Committee 
 President, Muslim League Malappuram Constituency Committee 
 Working Committee Member, Kerala State Muslim League
 President, Co-operative Employees Organisation (C.E.O.) State Committee 
 General Secretary, C.H. Centre, Malappuram

References

Kerala MLAs 2011–2016
Kerala MLAs 2016–2021
Indian Union Muslim League politicians
1960 births
Living people
Kerala MLAs 2021–2026